Isabella Flora Siteman (1842 – 18 March 1919) was a notable New Zealand domestic servant, farmer and philanthropist. She was born in Ninewells, Angus, Scotland, in about 1842.

References

1842 births
1919 deaths
New Zealand farmers
New Zealand women farmers
Scottish emigrants to New Zealand
New Zealand philanthropists
Servants
People from Angus, Scotland
19th-century New Zealand people
New Zealand domestic workers
19th-century philanthropists